73, 75 and 77 Low Petergate is a terrace of late Mediaeval buildings in York, in England.

The terrace was constructed in the late-16th century, and originally consisted of four houses.  Each is of three stories with an attic, and each storey is jettied over the one below.  They are timber-framed throughout, and this is largely exposed inside the upper floors.  In each building, part of the original staircase from the second floor to the attic survives.  In 75, a large chimney breast with two hearths survives.

The street fronts are rendered with stucco, with incisions designed to make it resemble ashlar.  73 and 77 have original gables, while 75 has twin gables which were added in the 17th century.  Various extensions have been added to the rear of the terrace, with the largest addition being to 73.

The houses lie on Low Petergate, one of the most important streets in the city centre, now a major shopping street.  In the 19th century, the ground floors were converted into three shops, and the shop front of 77 survives, while the others were further altered in the 20th century.  With the later house at 71 Low Petergate, and the earlier ones at 79 and 81 Low Petergate, they form a lengthy range of timber-framed buildings which Nikolaus Pevsner described as "impressive".  The terrace has been Grade II* listed since 1954.

References

Low Petergate 73-77
Low Petergate 73-77
Grade II* listed houses
Houses completed in the 16th century
Houses in North Yorkshire
Shops in England
Timber framed buildings in Yorkshire